Sir Geoffrey Thomas Hirst Bracken KCIE CSI (1879-1951) was a civil servant and bureaucrat of the Indian civil service who served as Chief Secretary of Madras Presidency from 1931 to 1935 and Revenue member of the Governor's Executive Council from 1935 to 1938.

Early life  
Bracken was born on 11 April 1879 at Leeds, United Kingdom, to Thomas H. Bracken. He studied at Malvern College and Oriel College, Oxford and qualified for the Indian civil service in 1902.

Career 
Bracken was initially posted as Assistant Collector of Tinnevely. He then served as Assistant Collector in Trichinopoly, Sattur, Tuticorin, Tanjore and Negapatam and Deputy Collector in Chingleput, Madras and Cocanada before being promoted District Collector and serving in Ganjam, East Godavari and Vizagapatam. Bracken was made a Companion of the Order of the Indian Empire and a Companion of the Order of the Star of India in 1930. In 1931, he was appointed Chief Secretary to the Government of Madras. On 19 March 1935, Bracken was made Finance Member in the executive council of the Governor of Madras. Bracken retired from the Indian Civil Service in 1938.

Death 
Bracken died on 11 June 1951 in the United Kingdom.

1879 births
1951 deaths
Alumni of Oriel College, Oxford
Knights Commander of the Order of the Indian Empire
Companions of the Order of the Star of India
British people in colonial India